Yasmine Naghdi (born in London on 25 March 1992) is a British ballerina and a principal dancer of The Royal Ballet in London. She joined the Royal Ballet's corps de ballet in April 2010. In June 2017, she was promoted to the highest rank of principal ballerina.

Early Life 
Naghdi grew up in Kensington, England to a Belgian art-historian mother and an Iranian car-manufacturing father.

At 12 years old she was accepted into the Royal Ballet School and performed in numerous ballets.  

Because Naghdi joined the Royal Ballet School "late" by ballet standards, she felt like an outcast and saw herself at "the bottom of the class". Despite her initial social struggles, she excelled at the Royal Ballet School, and was awarded "Most Outstanding Classical Dancer" at the age of 15.

In September 2008, Naghdi progressed into The Royal Ballet School's Senior Section/Upper School. In March 2009, she was awarded the First Prize after winning the national competition Young British Dancer of the Year by The Royal Ballet, which recognizes young British and British-trained classical dancers.

Career
Yasmine Naghdi joined The Royal Ballet company in April 2010, and was promoted to the rank of first artist by the end of 2011–12 season. She was made soloist at the end of the 2013–14 season, first soloist by the end of the 2015–16 season, and promoted to principal dancer by the end of 2016-2017 season.

At the age of 22, she made her debut as Juliet in Romeo and Juliet. At 24, she was promoted to The Royal Ballet's highest rank of principal ballerina by the end of the 2016–17 season. That same year, she made her debut as Odette/Odile in Swan Lake.

Repertory
Her major roles with the company include:

 Odette/Odile (Swan Lake)
 Aurora (The Sleeping Beauty)
 Giselle
 Juliet (Romeo and Juliet)
 Gamzatti (La Bayadère)
 Kitri (Don Quixote)
 Tatiana (Onegin)
 Swanilda (Coppelia)
 Baroness Mary Vetsera (Mayerling)
 Countess Larish (Mayerling)
 Sugar Plum Fairy (The Nutcracker)
 The Firebird
 Mathilde Kschessinska (Anastasia)
 Pink Girl (Dances at a Gathering)
 Irina (Winter Dreams), 
 Young Girl (Two Pigeons)
 Terpsichore (Apollo)
 Florence Billington (The Unknown Soldier)
 Stop Time Rag and Bethina Waltz (Elite Syncopations)
 The Girl (The Invitation)

Her further repertory includes:

 Le Corsaire Grand Pas
 Sylvia - Act 3 Grand Pas de deux
 Ballet Imperial (Balanchine)
 "Le Parc" (Angelin Preljocaj)
 "Three Preludes" (Ben Stevenson)
 Symphony in C
  ‘Emeralds’, ‘Rubies’, ‘Diamonds' (Jewels)
 Tarantella (Balanchine)
 The Four Temperaments (Balanchine)
 Symphonic Variations
 Monotones I
 La Sylphide
  Ballets created by choreographers Wayne McGregor and Christopher Wheeldon
 "Prima" (Valentino Zucchetti)

Honours
  First prize for Classical Excellence, The Royal Ballet School
  Most Outstanding Classical Dancer award, 2007
  First prize for the Kenneth Macmillan Choreographic Competition, The Royal Ballet School.
  First prize for Young British Dancer of the Year, 2009.
 Nominated for Best Female Dancer at the National Critics Dance Awards, 2018

References

External links
 Yasmine Naghdi — People — Royal Opera House
 Login • Instagram

Living people
British ballerinas
Principal dancers of The Royal Ballet
1992 births
People educated at Hill House School
People educated at the Royal Ballet School
21st-century British ballet dancers